Mikhail Viktorovich Rozhkov (born 27 December 1983) is a Kazakh former international footballer.

Career

Club
During the 2009 preseason, he tried out with FC Dynamo Moscow and FC Moscow but ended up signing with FC Rostov. He made his debut in the Russian Premier League on 14 March 2009 in a game against FC Amkar Perm.

At the end of 2012 season, Rozhkov was involved in a car accident, that resulted him fracturing his hip and being in coma.

International
Rozhkov made his debut for Kazakhstan on 3 March 2010 against Moldova.

Career statistics

Club

International

Statistics accurate as of match played 12 October 2012

References

External links
 
 

1983 births
Living people
Kazakhstani footballers
FC Rostov players
Russian Premier League players
Kazakhstani expatriate footballers
Expatriate footballers in Russia
Kazakhstan international footballers
Kazakhstani expatriate sportspeople in Russia
FC Astana players
Association football defenders
FC Nosta Novotroitsk players